Jamali Noorpur is one of the 51 Union Councils (administrative subdivisions) of the Khushab District in the Punjab Province of Pakistan.

References

Union councils of Khushab District